Kosti Katajamäki (born 26 February 1977) is a rally driver from Finland.

Career
He made his rallying debut in 1997 in a Ford Escort RS2000. He won the Group N class of the Finnish Rally Championship in 2001 and the Group A class in 2005. His first World Rally Championship event was the 2001 Rally Finland, driving a Volkswagen Polo. He has competed sporadically in the WRC in recent years, driving a Suzuki Ignis S1600 and a Stobart M-Sport Ford Focus WRC. He is a protégé of double World Rally Champion Marcus Grönholm. In 2006, he scored his first points at the Rally Sweden while finishing sixth. His career best result came in his last event in the WRC when he finished fifth at the 2006 Rally of Turkey.

Complete WRC results

JWRC results

References

1977 births
Living people
Finnish rally drivers
World Rally Championship drivers

Volkswagen Motorsport drivers
M-Sport drivers